Dawber is an English surname, found mainly in Lancashire. It was originally given to builders using wattle and daub. Notable people with the surname include:
Andrew Dawber (born 1994), English footballer
Chelsie Dawber (born 2000), Australian women's football player
Guy Dawber (1861–1938), English architect
Pam Dawber (born 1951), American actress
Rob Dawber (1956–2001), British railwayman and writer
Tracy Dawber (born 1966), English paedophile convicted in the 2009 Plymouth child abuse case
Paul Dawber (born 1956), English born Australian actor

References

English-language surnames
Occupational surnames